Chemokine (C-X-C motif) ligand 2 (CXCL2) is a small cytokine belonging to the CXC chemokine family that is also called macrophage inflammatory protein 2-alpha (MIP2-alpha), Growth-regulated protein beta (Gro-beta) and Gro oncogene-2 (Gro-2).  CXCL2 is 90% identical in amino acid sequence as a related chemokine, CXCL1. This chemokine is secreted by monocytes and macrophages and is chemotactic for polymorphonuclear leukocytes and hematopoietic stem cells. The gene for CXCL2 is located on human chromosome 4 in a cluster of other CXC chemokines. CXCL2 mobilizes cells by interacting with a cell surface chemokine receptor called CXCR2.

CXCL2, like related chemokines, is also a powerful neutrophil chemoattractant and is involved in many immune responses including wound healing, cancer metastasis, and angiogenesis. A study was published in 2013 testing the role of CXCL2, CXCL3, and CXCL1 in the migration of airway smooth muscle cells (ASMCs) migration which plays a significant role in asthma. The results of this study showed that CXCL2 and CXCL3 both help with the mediation of normal and asthmatic ASMC migration through different mechanisms.

Clinical development 

CXCL2 in combination with the CXCR4 inhibitor plerixafor rapidly mobilizes hematopoietic stem cells into the peripheral blood. 

This rapid peripheral blood stem cell mobilization regimen entered Phase 2 clinical trials in 2021 in development by Magenta Therapeutics as a new method to collect stem cells for bone marrow transplantation.

References 

Cytokines